Sir John Newton, 2nd Baronet (9 June 162631 May 1699) was an English politician who sat in the House of Commons from 1660 to 1685.

Newton was the son of Thomas Newton of Gunwarley, Lincolnshire.

In 1660, Newton was elected Member of Parliament for Grantham in the Convention Parliament. In 1661 he inherited the baronetcy of Barrs Court on the death of Sir John Newton, 1st Baronet who died childless and had provision under the patent to bequeath his title and Culverthorpe Hall estate accordingly.

He was re-elected MP for Grantham in 1661 to the Cavalier Parliament and held the seat through subsequent parliaments to 1685.
 
Newton died at the age of 73. He had married Mary Eyre daughter of Sir Gervase Eyre of Rampton, Nottinghamshire. Their son John succeeded to the baronetcy and the Culverthorpe estate.

References

1626 births
1699 deaths
Baronets in the Baronetage of England
English MPs 1660
English MPs 1661–1679
English MPs 1679
English MPs 1680–1681
English MPs 1681